Agnorhiza invenusta (syn. Wyethia invenusta) is a species of flowering plant known by the common names Coville's mule's ears and rayless mule's ears. It is found only in California, where it grows in the Sierra Nevada foothills as in Fresno, Tulare, and Kern Counties.

Agnorhiza invenusta is a perennial herb growing from a thick taproot and caudex unit. The hairy, glandular stem grows up to a meter tall. The leaves have triangular or oval blades, up to 15 to 20 centimeters long. The inflorescence is made up of one or more flower heads. The head has lance-shaped phyllaries which may be more than 3 centimeters long.

The plant usually does not have ray florets, but there may be 2 or 3. The fruit is an achene nearly a centimeter long with no pappus.

References

External links
United States Department of Agriculture Plants Profile

Heliantheae
Flora of California
Plants described in 1889
Flora without expected TNC conservation status